Nil Vinyals (born 21 September 1996) is a Spanish footballer who plays as a midfielder for Richmond Kickers in USL League One.

References

External links
 
 Profile at Winthrop Athletics

1996 births
Living people
Spanish footballers
Spanish expatriate footballers
Spanish expatriate sportspeople in the United States
Association football midfielders
Expatriate soccer players in the United States
Footballers from Barcelona
Richmond Kickers players
Tormenta FC players
USL League One players
USL League Two players
Winthrop Eagles men's soccer players